Sverre Fredheim (December 10, 1907 –  April 9, 1981) was an American Olympic skier.

Fredheim was born at Gran in Oppland, Norway. He emigrated to the United States during 1927. He joined the St. Paul Ski Club and became a US citizen in 1935. He competed in ski jumping at the 1936 Winter Olympics in Garmisch-Partenkirchen, and at the 1948 Winter Olympics in St. Moritz, where he placed sixth in ski jumping.
In 1951, he placed ninth place in the Olympic tryouts at Iron Mountain, Michigan. In 1955, he began competing in Veteran’s meets.  Fredheim was elected to the National Ski Hall of Fame in 1973.

References

1907 births
1981 deaths
American male ski jumpers
People from Gran, Norway
Norwegian emigrants to the United States
Olympic ski jumpers of the United States
Ski jumpers at the 1936 Winter Olympics
Ski jumpers at the 1948 Winter Olympics